Jai Rani SABS Public School is an English Medium School in Balussery. It was established in 1997, in the name of Alphonsa EM-LP School. The syllabus of the school is CBSE.

References

Schools in Kozhikode district
Educational institutions established in 1997
1997 establishments in Kerala